Thomas Bouchard may refer to:

 Thomas J. Bouchard Jr. (born 1937), American psychologist and geneticist
 Thomas Bouchard (politician) (1865–1943), solicitor and member of the Queensland Legislative Assembly